John Ashley Griswold (November 18, 1822 – February 22, 1902) was an attorney, judge and politician from Catskill, New York.  He was most notable for his service as a U.S. Representative from 1869 to 1871.

Early life
Griswold was born in Cairo, New York on November 18, 1822, the son of Stephen H. and Phoebe ( Ashley) Griswold.  Griswold attended the common schools, and the academies in Prattsville and Catskill, New York.

Career
He taught school and then studied law with his uncle, Addison C. Griswold, and Richard Corning, a brother of Erastus Corning.  Griswold was admitted to the bar in 1848, after which he commenced practice in Greene County.

A Democrat in politics, Griswold served as district attorney of Greene County from 1856 to 1859, and as county judge from 1863 to 1867.

He declined to be a candidate for renomination in 1870 and resumed the practice of law. Griswold was elected Town Supervisor of Catskill in 1871, and served one term. He served as member of the State constitutional convention in 1894.

Personal life
In 1857, Griswold married Elizabeth M. Roberts of Clintondale, New York.  She died in 1896.

He died of "old age" in Catskill on February 22, 1902. He was interred in Catskill Village Cemetery.

References

Sources

Books

Newspapers

External links

John Ashley Griswold at The Political Graveyard

1822 births
1902 deaths
Democratic Party members of the United States House of Representatives from New York (state)
New York (state) state court judges
People from Cairo, New York
19th-century American politicians
Griswold family
19th-century American judges